Rex Richards may refer to:

 Rex Richards (chemist) (1922–2019), British chemist and academic
 Rex Richards (rugby union) (1934–1989), Welsh rugby union player

See also
Richards (surname)